Mustafa Ertan (21 April 1926 – 17 December 2005) was a Turkish football defender who played for Turkey in the 1954 FIFA World Cup. He also played for MKE Ankaragücü and competed for Turkey at the 1952 Summer Olympics and the 1960 Summer Olympics.

References

External links
 
 

1926 births
2005 deaths
Turkish footballers
Turkey international footballers
Association football defenders
1954 FIFA World Cup players
Beşiktaş J.K. footballers
Turkish football managers
Turkey under-21 international footballers
Olympic footballers of Turkey
Footballers at the 1952 Summer Olympics
Footballers at the 1960 Summer Olympics